Hiram Church Ford (July 28, 1884 – June 8, 1969) was a United States district judge of the United States District Court for the Eastern District of Kentucky.

Education and career

Born in Scott County, Kentucky, Ford received an Artium Baccalaureus degree from Georgetown College in 1905 and a Bachelor of Laws from the law department of Kentucky University (now Transylvania University) in 1907. He was generally in private practice in Georgetown, Kentucky from 1907 to 1931, also serving as a county attorney for Scott County from 1910 to 1926. He was a Circuit Judge for the 14th Judicial District of Kentucky from 1931 to 1935.

Federal judicial service

On March 19, 1935, Ford was nominated by President Franklin D. Roosevelt to a seat on the United States District Court for the Eastern District of Kentucky vacated by Judge Andrew McConnell January Cochran. Ford was confirmed by the United States Senate on March 27, 1935, and received his commission on March 28, 1935. He served as Chief Judge from 1948 to 1963, assuming senior status on January 1, 1963, and serving in that capacity until his death on June 8, 1969, in Georgetown.

Note

References

Sources
 

1884 births
1969 deaths
Judges of the United States District Court for the Eastern District of Kentucky
United States district court judges appointed by Franklin D. Roosevelt
20th-century American judges
Georgetown College (Kentucky) alumni
Transylvania University alumni